is a Japanese Nippon Professional Baseball pitcher for the Hanshin Tigers in Japan's Central League.

External links

Living people
1985 births
Baseball people from Tochigi Prefecture
Japanese baseball players
Nippon Professional Baseball pitchers
Hanshin Tigers players